Jean Spautz (born 9 September 1930 in Schifflange) is a politician in Luxembourg, and a Member of the European Parliament for the Christian Social People's Party, part of the European People's Party.
1930, Schifflange (L), Worker (ouvrier-lamineur) at ARBED-Belval, trade unionist and secretary of the worker's delegation.

Titles, positions and offices

 President of the Christian Syndicates Luxembourg (L.C.G.B.) (1967–1980).
 President of Jeunesse Ouvrière catholique (catholic working youth) (J.O.C.) (1954–1959) and President of the youth section of the Christian-Social Party (1960–1966).
 President of the Christian-Social Party (1982–1995)
 Member of the Chambre des Députés (Luxembourg Parliament) since 1959.
 Member of the Bureau de la Chambre des Députés (1964–1976).
 Vice-Chairman of the Chambre des Députés (Luxembourg Parliament) (1979–1980).
 Member of European Parliament, MEP (July 1979-February 1980 and from July 2004-July 2009).
 Minister of Home affairs (1980–1995), Minister of Family affairs (1980–1989), Minister of Housing (1989–1995).
 Chairman of the Chambre des Députés (Luxembourg Parliament) (1995–2004).
 Honorary Chairman of the Chambre des Députés (Luxembourg Parliament) since 2004.

References

|-

|-

1930 births
Living people
Government ministers of Luxembourg
MEPs for Luxembourg 2004–2009
Presidents of the Chamber of Deputies (Luxembourg)
Members of the Chamber of Deputies (Luxembourg)
Councillors in Schifflange
Christian Social People's Party politicians
Luxembourgian trade unionists
People from Schifflange
Christian Social People's Party MEPs
MEPs for Luxembourg 1979–1984
21st-century Luxembourgian politicians